Traugott is both a surname and a male given name of German origin. The name first appeared in the 17th century and is hardly used today. Its meaning is 'trust in god'. Notable people with the name include:

Surname:
Elizabeth C. Traugott (born 1939), emeritus professor at Stanford University
Leah Traugott (1924–2018), American watercolorist and educator
Michael Traugott, American political scientist, communication studies researcher, and political pundit
Peter Traugott (born 1965), American television producer, President of Television at Brillstein-Grey Entertainment
Tristan Traugott (born 1997), South African cricketer
Wolfdietrich Traugott (born 1939), Austrian rower

Middle name
Carl Traugott Beilschmied (1793–1848), German pharmacist and botanist
Johann Traugott Leberecht Danz (1769–1851), German theologian and church historian
Christian Friedrich Traugott Duttenhofer (1778–1846), German engraver
Friedrich Traugott Friedemann (1793–1853), German educator, philologist and archivist
Johann Samuel Traugott Gehler (1751–1795), German lawyer and physicist
Karl Christian Traugott Friedemann Goebel (1794–1851), German pharmacist and chemist
Wilhelm Traugott Krug (1770–1842), German philosopher and writer
Friedrich Traugott Kützing (1807–1893), German pharmacist, botanist and phycologist
Paul Traugott Meissner (1778–1864), Austrian chemist
Frederick Traugott Pursh (1774–1820), German-American botanist
Karl Traugott Queisser (1800–1846), played trombone and viola in the Gewandhaus Orchestra under Felix Mendelssohn
Hermann Traugott Rüdisühli (1864–1944),) was a Swiss painter, in the Rüdisühli family of artists
Karl Christoph Traugott Tauchnitz (1761–1836), German printer and bookseller
Karl August Traugott Vogt (1808–1869), German Protestant theologian
Friedrich Traugott Wahlen (1899–1985), Swiss politician

First name:
Traugott Wilhelm Boehm (1836–1917), schoolmaster, founder of the German School in Hahndorf, South Australia
Traugott Buhre (1929–2009), German actor
Traugott Maximilian Eberwein (1775–1831), German composer and conductor
Traugott Glöckler (born 1944), German athlete
Traugott Herr (1890–1976), German general of Panzer troops who served during World War II
Traugott Kempas (1919–1945), highly decorated Major in the Wehrmacht during World War II
Traugott Lawler (born 1937), medievalist scholar, expert on William Langland, emeritus professor of English at Yale University
Traugott Märki, Swiss footballer
Traugott Oberer (1924–1974), Swiss footballer
Traugott Ochs (1854–1919), German court Kapellmeister, organist and conductor
Traugott Konstantin Oesterreich (1880–1949), German religious psychologist and philosopher
Traugott Sandmeyer (1854–1922), Swiss chemist who discovered the Sandmeyer reaction in 1884
Traugott von Sauberzweig (1863–1920), Prussian Lieutenant General  in the German Army during World War I
Traugott Bernhard Zwar (1876–1947), Australian academic, army medical officer and surgeon

See also
Staub-Traugott Phenomenon (or Staub-Traugott Effect) is the premise that a normal subject fed glucose will rapidly return to normal levels of blood glucose after an initial spike, and will see improved reaction to subsequent glucose feedings

References

German masculine given names
German-language surnames